Henry Kroger (27 June 1906 – 16 July 1987) was an Australian cricketer. He played two first-class cricket matches for Victoria between 1935 and 1936.

See also
 List of Victoria first-class cricketers

References

External links
 

1906 births
1987 deaths
Australian cricketers
Victoria cricketers
Cricketers from Melbourne